Tourello is a locality in western Victoria, Australia. At the 2021 census, Tourello and the surrounding area had a population of 46.

References

Towns in Victoria (Australia)